Justice Gallagher may refer to:

Frank T. Gallagher, associate justice of the Minnesota Supreme Court
Henry M. Gallagher, chief justice of the Minnesota Supreme Court
Thomas F. Gallagher, associate justice of the Minnesota Supreme Court

See also
Judge Gallagher (disambiguation)